Lee Meong-Hee (born 4 July 1978) is a South Korean female volleyball player.
 She was part of the South Korea women's national volleyball team which competed   at the 2000 Summer Olympics in Sydney, Australia, finishing 8th.

She participated in the 1998 FIVB Volleyball Women's World Championship, and 2003 FIVB Women's World Cup.

See also
 South Korea at the 2000 Summer Olympics

References

1978 births
Living people
South Korean women's volleyball players
Volleyball players at the 2000 Summer Olympics
Olympic volleyball players of South Korea
Asian Games medalists in volleyball
Volleyball players at the 1998 Asian Games
Volleyball players at the 2002 Asian Games
Medalists at the 1998 Asian Games
Medalists at the 2002 Asian Games
Asian Games silver medalists for South Korea